Mosherville  is a community in the Canadian province of Nova Scotia, located in  The Municipality of the District of West Hants.  The community was first settled by New England Planter James Mosher and his wife Lydia (Allan) Mosher (c. 1762), originally of Newport, Rhode Island.

Mosherville, Hants County is mentioned in Nova Scotia fiction writer Barry Wood's short story "Nowhere to Go" published in England's Postscripts #14 in 2008, as well as in poet Alden Nowlan's poem "The Mosherville Road."

References
 Mosherville on Destination Nova Scotia

Communities in Hants County, Nova Scotia
General Service Areas in Nova Scotia